Space Cop is a 2016 American science fiction action comedy film directed and produced by Jay Bauman and Mike Stoklasa, written by Stoklasa and edited by Bauman. The film stars Rich Evans, Stoklasa, Jocelyn Ridgely, and Bauman. Produced and distributed by Red Letter Media, the film had been in production for at least seven years dating back to 2008.

The film was released on Blu-ray on January 12, 2016 and on digital download on January 30, 2016.

Premise
Space Cop, a highly disgruntled, impulsive and destructive police officer from the future of 2058, accidentally travels back in time to 2007 after a pursuit through space causes him to travel through a time rift. He then spends eight years as a member of the Milwaukee Police Department.

After encountering two alien criminals he comes across during a heist at a cryonic storage facility, he is teamed up with a comparatively more methodical and by-the-book police officer from the past who is accidentally unfrozen in the present. They are tasked with apprehending a criminal known as the Gold Digger known for stealing exclusively gold-based items.

However, when they discover that the Gold Digger is in fact a part of a much bigger plan effected by alien lifeforms, they must defeat the evil aliens who threaten the present and the future.

Cast

 Rich Evans as Space Cop (born Holden Madickey)
 Mike Stoklasa as Detective Ted Cooper
 Jocelyn Ridgely as Zorba
 Chike Johnson as Agnon
 Jay Bauman as Grigg
 Zack McLain as Charlie
 Alison Mary Forbes as Charlie's wife
 Dale R. Jackson as Chief Washington
 Clarence Aumend as Officer Partner
 Rick Pendzich as Officer Cunningham and hostage taker
 Patton Oswalt as Space Police Chief (uncredited)
 Freddie E. Williams II as Solitaire Man
 Len Kabasinski as Space Cop (Stunt Double)

Production
A documentary-style video released on the Red Letter Media channel on YouTube in 2020 features extensive behind-the-scenes material and details on the building and execution of various sets and scenes. As a general rule, only one larger set could be built at any time due to the physical restrictions of the facilities available to production. Additionally, while some digital effects usually related to simple green screens were used, decidedly practical movie tricks also came into play on several occasions. For example, in one scene featuring a pot of boiling water on a stove, the boiling effect had in fact been generated by Rich Evans blowing air through tubes attached to the pot's bottom (to avoid using actual boiling water, for safety).

Release and reception
Space Cop was released straight to Blu-ray on January 12, 2016 and on digital download on January 30, 2016.

Mark Varley of Moviepilot wrote that, despite the filmmakers wanting "to make a film that was tongue in cheek...Space Cop was boring and unfunny". Felix Vasquez Jr. of Cinema Crazed wrote that the film is "a neat, if flawed, mash up of genres reserved for select movie fans that appreciate this kind of comedy, or have been loyal followers of the Red Letter Media team for years".

References

External links
 
 Behind the Scenes
 
 Space Cop on Rotten Tomatoes

2016 films
American direct-to-video films
American action comedy films
American science fiction comedy films
American science fiction films
American science fiction action films
Cryonics in fiction
Films about time travel
Films set in 2007
Films set in 2015
Films set in 2058
Films set in Milwaukee
Films shot in Wisconsin
Flying cars in fiction
Moon in film
2010s English-language films
2010s American films